Warramunga is a genus of grasshoppers in the family Morabidae. There is one described species in Warramunga, Warramunga desertorum, found in Australia.

References

Morabidae
Insects described in 1952
Orthoptera of Australia